The International Lesbian, Gay, Bisexual, Transgender, Queer & Intersex Youth and Student Organisation (IGLYO) is an international LGBTQI organisation that was created in 1984 as a reaction to the need for better cooperation among regional, local and national LGBTQI youth and student organisations. It advocates on behalf of members to international bodies, institutions and other organisations.

IGLYO is a membership-based umbrella organisation representing 95 member organisations in more than 45 countries.

Advocacy 
IGLYO is active member of the European Youth Forum, ILGA, ILGA-Europe, the Euromedplatform, and is an associate member organisation of the European Students' Union.

Governance 
The organization is led by an elected Executive Board who are mandated by the General Assembly, which is the highest decision making body of the organisation. Executive board members serve for a two-year mandate, must be nominated by one of IGLYO's member organisations and between 18 - 30 years old at the time of election. The Executive Board is supported by a secretariat in Brussels, Belgium and led by two co-chairs.

References

External links 
 

LGBT organizations based in Europe
Youth empowerment organizations
International LGBT youth organizations
European student organizations